Lake Weyba is a large shallow salt lake in the Shire of Noosa, Queensland, Australia.

Lake Weyba is an important fish-breeding habitat. In the early 1900s, Lake Weyba had a large number of stingrays, which would have been easy targets for spear fishing Aboriginal Australians.

References

Lakes of Queensland
Geography of Sunshine Coast, Queensland